Braken may refer to:

 Braken Hamlet, a hamlet in Wuustwezel, Belgium
 Bracken, a genus of ferns
 Braken Bat Cave meshweaver, a species of spider

See also
 Bracken County, Kentucky, United States
 Broken (disambiguation)
 Brake (disambiguation)
 Break (disambiguation)